Deer Avenger is a series of video games about a deer who hunts humans. It was developed by Simon & Schuster Interactive and Hypnotix. It is a parody of the Deer Hunter series of games.

Games
 Deer Avenger
 Deer Avenger 2: Deer in the City
 Deer Avenger 3D
 Deer Avenger 4: The Rednecks Strike Back

Development
Following the release of Deer Avenger in 1998, Simon & Schuster received email complaints from hunters. Walter Walker, a vice president for the company, was quoted in the Los Angeles Times saying "our first notion was to make these guys a gift of a dictionary, because not many of them can write."

Brian McCann, who voiced the character Bambo, wrote jokes for Deer Avenger and Deer Avenger 2. According to Hypnotix founder Mike Taramykin, McCann recruited colleagues from NBC to be voice actors for the series. Tina Fey and Amy Poehler were among the actors to voice characters in Deer Avenger 2.

The third game in the series, Deer Avenger 3D, was released in 2000 for PC. A unreleased port of the game for the Sega Dreamcast was developed by Westlake Interactive in 2000, but went undiscovered until 2017 when a pre-production GD-ROM was found at the garage sale of a women's club in New Jersey.

Starting with Deer Avenger 3D, polygon characters are used.

In the fourth edition of the game, as Bubba, now an angel, floats to Heaven, he states will be back in Deer Avenger 5. However, a fifth game has yet to be made.

Deer Avenger: Stag Party is a box set containing the first two games in the series.

Deer Avenger: Open Season is a compilation of the first three games in the series.

Characters

Bambo
The protagonist of the game is an anthropomorphic deer named Bambo, a portmanteau of the action hero Rambo and the Disney character Bambi. He is bipedal and hunts humans in a fashion similar to typical deer hunting in order to avenge all deer hunted by humans. Bambo mounts the heads of humans he kills on a wall in his cabin. He can tote a vast array of weapons ranging from slingshots to machine guns. He is voiced by Brian McCann, who frequently appeared on Late Night with Conan O'Brien.

In the first three games, Bambo has a sleek physique with a bandana tied around his forehead, a forest green hunting vest, and an ammo bandolier. However, in the fourth game, Bambo has a broad-shouldered, muscular physique. The cause for this change was never explained.

Bambo is very crude and crass, often farting, and yelling obscenities and stereotypical jokes at his prey.

Tree Hugger
Tree Hugger is a sprite with purple clothing that "prances through the forest flailing his hands and pointing out rainbows." He asks "Does anyone want to see my nipples?" The Tree Hugger character was criticized by GLAAD, who asked whether Deer Avenger was "parody or pansy-baiting?" The game designers said that the character isn't gay, with co-creator Jeff Siegel explaining that Tree Hugger was meant to be a parody of environmentalists.

References

External links
Deer Avenger. Hypnotix, Wayback Machine.
Deer Avenger 2. Hypnotix, Wayback Machine.
Deer Avenger 3D. Hypnotix, Wayback Machine.
Deer Avenger 4. Hypnotix, Wayback Machine.
Open Season. Hypnotix, Wayback Machine.

1998 video games
Action video games
North America-exclusive video games
Video games developed in the United States
Video game franchises introduced in 1998
Parody video games
Windows games
Windows-only games
Simon & Schuster Interactive games
Single-player video games